Wendover was a borough constituency of the House of Commons of the Parliament of England then of the Parliament of Great Britain from 1707 to 1800 and of the Parliament of the United Kingdom from 1801 to 1832. It was based on the borough of Wendover, was represented by two Members of Parliament, and was considered a classic example of a pocket borough.

History
Wendover first sent members to Parliament in 1300, but after 1308, elected no burgesses for more than 300 years. However, in the 17th century a solicitor named William Hakewill, of Lincoln's Inn, rediscovered ancient writs confirming that Amersham, Great Marlow, and Wendover had all sent members to Parliament in the past, and succeeded in re-establishing their privileges (despite the opposition of James I), so that they resumed electing members from the Parliament of 1624. Hakewill himself was elected for Amersham in 1624.

The borough consisted of most of the market town of Wendover in Buckinghamshire. It was one of the smallest boroughs in England: in 1831, the population of the borough was approximately 802, and contained 171 houses. (The whole town contained 198 houses.) The right to vote was exercised by all inhabitant householders not receiving alms, which amounted to about 130 voters in 1831. Although this was a relatively large electorate for the time based on apparently democratic franchise, the borough and inhabitants were totally dependent on the Lord of the Manor, who was able to exercise considerable influence and sometimes total control over the choice of MPs. In the 17th century, this patronage lay with the Hampden family, but in 1720 Richard Hampden apparently attempted to sell his interest in the borough to the government after losing £80,000 in the South Sea Bubble; what price he received for it, or whether the sale ever took place, is not recorded. By the 1750s, Wendover had passed to Earl Verney, and Namier lists his power as only being one of influence rather than total control; but by 1832 the Smith family (headed by Lord Carrington) seem to have been able to regard it as an absolutely secure pocket borough.

Wendover was abolished as a constituency by the Great Reform Act in 1832, those of its inhabitants who were qualified to vote under the new franchise doing so in the Buckinghamshire county constituency.

Members of Parliament

Constituency disenfranchised (1309)
Constituency re-enfranchised (1624)

Notes

References
 
 GENUKI
 D. Brunton & D. H. Pennington, Members of the Long Parliament (London: George Allen & Unwin, 1954)
 J. Holladay Philbin, Parliamentary Representation 1832: England and Wales (New Haven: Yale University Press, 1965)
 Edward Porritt and Annie G. Porritt, The Unreformed House of Commons (Cambridge University Press, 1903)

Constituencies of the Parliament of the United Kingdom established in 1300
Parliamentary constituencies in Buckinghamshire (historic)
Rotten boroughs
Constituencies of the Parliament of the United Kingdom disestablished in 1832